The Little Russian identity was a cultural, political, and ethnic self-identification of a population of Ukraine who aligned themselves as one of the constituent parts of the triune Russian nationality. The Little Russian identity combined the cultures of Imperial Russia and Cossack Hetmanate.

The beginning of the development of the Little Russian identity in the Cossack Hetmanate dates back to the late 18th century.

The new ethnonym was promoted instead of the widespread name Ruthenian (Rusyny; русини). The struggle between the two projects of national identity lasted until the dissolution of the Russian Empire. The revolutionary events of 1917 led to a rapid strengthening of the Ukrainian national idea, which was backed by many Western Ukrainians in Galicia who joined the political life in Kiev. Because of their adjacency to the Russian White Movement, political activists with Little Russian, and Pan-Russian views were among the social groups who suffered the most during the Revolution, and the troubles of the Civil War; many of whom were killed during the war or forced to emigrate.

After the end of the Civil War, the process of Ukrainian nation-building was resumed in the territory of Ukrainian SSR by the Bolshevik party and the Soviet authorities, who introduced the policy of korenizatsiya, the implementation of which in the Ukrainian SSR was called Ukrainization. As a result, the term "Little Russian" was marginalized and remained in usage only among White emigres.

Emergence 
The Little Russian political ideology emerged simultaneous to the revival of the Byzantine term Little Rus' at the end of the 16th century in the literary works of the Christian Orthodox clergy of the Polish–Lithuanian Commonwealth. Numerous prominent Orthodox authors and hierarchs, such as Ivan Vyshenskyi, Zakharia Kopystenskyi, Yelisey Pletenetskyi or Job Boretsky strongly opposed the Union of Brest and polemicized with Roman Catholics and Uniates, developing the ideas of a pan-Russian Orthodox people. The Little Russian idea steadily gained support among Cossack leadership and Orthodox brotherhoods, which were subject to judicial, economic and religious discrimination; and repeatedly organized violent uprisings against Polish rule from the end of the 16th to the first half of the 17th century. Simultaneously, the image of an Orthodox Tsar who would protect the All-Russian people against the injustice of the Poles became a political tool used by Moscovite rulers. Later, the existence of such sentiments facilitated the signing of the Treaty of Pereyaslav during the Khmelnytsky Uprising as well as the political integration of the Hetmanate into the Tsardom of Russia.

After the Pereyaslav Treaty the Hetmanate faced a civil war known as The Ruin between pro-Russian and pro-Polish forces. After the pro-Polish fraction lost Left-bank Ukraine, the Little Russian identity ultimately consolidated after already being strongly enrooted in ecclesiastic circles. An important milestone was the 1674 publication of the Kievan Synopsis by the archimandrite of the Kiev Pechersk Lavra and the rector of the Kievan Theological School Innocent Gizel. In his work he described the dynastic succession between Kiev and Moscow as well as the existence of an All-Russian nation which has its origins in the ancient people of the Kievan Rus. Throughout the 18th century Synopsis was the most widespread and popular historical work in Russia.

Under the influence of the Kiev-born archbishop of the Russian Orthodox Church Theophan Prokopovich the Russian Empire gradually became the object of primary identification of Little Russians while  The Cossack elite under Russian rule looked for ways to legitimize its social status in the hierarchy of the Russian Empire to benefit from the perspective of attractive career possibilities. Supporters of the Little Russian identity considered the Russian Empire as their own state which they built together with (Great) Russians. In the 18th century many Little Russians held important political positions of the Empire: Chancellor Alexander Bezborodko, minister of education Pyotr Zavadovsky, general prosecutor Dmitry Troshchinsky, Field Marshal and President of the Academy of Science Kyrylo Rozumovskyi, Field Marshal Alexey Razumovsky among others.

The Little Russian identity didn't aim at blurring local peculiarities as long as they didn't contradict the most important thing: the idea of a cultural and political All-Russian unity. Little Russians had not the opinion that they are "sacrificing" the interests of their local homeland to the Great Russians or that they have to abandon their identity in favour of the Great Russian.

The Little Russian identity was not the only form of self-identification that existed in Ukraine prior to the emergence of the Ukrainian national identity. The supporters of hetman Ivan Mazepa who rebelled against Russian emperor Peter I favored a Khazarian origin to the Cossack people, which they considered a distinct nation. It told that the "Cossack people" originates from the old Khazars unrelated to Russians. This version is also described in the Orlyk Constitution.

Rivalry with the Ukrainian idea

Russian Empire 
In the second half of the 19th century an alternative identity project emerged which was called Ukrainianness (українство). The naming referred to the territory of Ukraine which in the earlier times designated the border region south of Kiev inhabited by Cossacks. The characteristical traits of the new political ideology was the growing rejection of any cultural and ethnic ties with Russia. The basis of Ukrainianness was laid by members of the Brotherhood of Saints Cyril and Methodius, led by Mykola Kostomarov.

With the support of local authorities, the Ukrainianness got particularly rapid development on the territory of Galicia which belonged to Austria-Hungary. The rivalry between the Little Russian and the Ukrainian identity which intensified in the period prior to World War I had the character of a local Kulturkampf and terminological war. The rhetorical battle was led for the cultural heritage of Little Russia and the identity of many key figures such as Taras Shevchenko. Hot polemics inflamed about historical issues, personalities and the interpretation of Little Russia's history. One of the most influential supporters of Ukrainianness was Mykhailo Hrushevskyi, the author of the large historical monograph, the "History of Ukraine-Rus". His work emphasized that Ukrainians and Russians had a separate ethnogenesis.

Also in the linguistic question the "Little Russians" and the "Ukrainians" had strong differences. While the first ones considered the literary Russian language as a common creation and spiritual value of all three Russian branches and spoke of a Little Russian dialect, the last ones promoted the views that Ukrainian is an autonomous language and made big efforts to standardize it as soon as possible.

Soviet Union 

The Little Russian identity remained dominant among elites even in the revolutionary years of 1917–1921. However, with the beginning of the Bolshevik policy of Ukrainization, which was the local form of the Korenizatsiya policy, the Little Russian identity was declared 'antiquated and illegitimate'. In the 1920s Bolshevik internationalists used the Ukrainian SSR and the Byelorussian SSR as "exhibition pavillons" of their nationality policy, hoping to gain sympathies of the disadvantaged East Slavic population in interwar Poland. At the same time they hoped to ultimately weaken pan-Russian imperialism in a society that was represented by their adversary in the Russian civil war: the Imperial Russian White Movement. The Bolsheviks had the largest credit in the realization and consolidation of the Ukrainian identity project. In the First All-Union Census of the Soviet Union (1926) the registration of people as Little Russians was restricted, and people in the Ukrainian SSR had to choose between the Ukrainian and Russian nationality or even were automatically registered as Ukrainians. The term 'Little Russian' remained in usage only among some White emigres.

Although the antiquated Little Russian identity gave way to the new ethnonym Ukrainian, and the conception of an All-Russian people was replaced by a new conception of brotherly but separate peoples, certain elements of the Little Russian identity persisted. The Ukrainian nation was regarded as "brotherly" to the Russian, and the striving towards political unification with the Russians was described in Soviet history books as the leitmotif of Ukrainian history. In the described way the Soviet ideology combined elements of Ukrainian and Little Russian identities.

Present times 
In the period of glasnost and perestroika in the late 1980s, as well as after Ukraine declared its independence in 1991, Little Russian elements came under increased pressure. Representatives in the Ukrainian diaspora in Canada, the United States and western Europe got an opportunity to exert influence on societal processes in Ukraine.

Reception 
Nowadays, some Ukrainian authors consider the Little Russian identity as a sociological complex of reduced patriotism among some parts of Ukrainian society, due to Ukrainian areas being part of Russian Empire for a long time.

See also 
 Western Ukrainian Russophiles
All-Russian nation
Nashism
National Bolshevism
Neo-Sovietism
Neo-Stalinism
Novorossiya
Pochvennichestvo
Russia–European Union relations
Russia–Ukraine relations
Russophilia
Rusyns
Black Ruthenia
Red Ruthenia
White Ruthenia
Little Russia
Great Russia
New Russia
Moscow, third Rome
Russian World

Notes

References

Literature
Kohut Z. The Development of a Little Russian Identity and Ukrainian Nationbuilding // Harvard Ukrainian Studies. — 1986. — 10. — H. 3/4. — P. 556—576.
Мацузато К. Ядро или периферия империи? Генерал-губернаторство и малороссийская идентичность // Ab Imperio. — 2002. — No. 2.

Early Modern history of Ukraine
Little Russia Governorate
Politics of the Russian Empire
Politics of Ukraine
Russian nationalism in Ukraine